Athletes from Kuwait participated in the 2011 Asian Winter Games in Almaty and Astana, Kazakhstan from January 30, 2011 to February 6, 2011. These athletes competed under the Olympic flag because the Kuwait Olympic Committee had been suspended by the International Olympic Committee in January 2010.

Ice hockey

Men
The team is in the premier division for these games.

Premier Division

See also 
 Athletes from Kuwait at the 2010 Summer Youth Olympics
 Athletes from Kuwait at the 2010 Asian Games
 Athletes from Kuwait at the 2010 Asian Para Games

References

Nations at the 2011 Asian Winter Games
2011 in Kuwaiti sport
Kuwait at the Asian Winter Games
Athletics in Kuwait